İbrahim Kavrakoğlu (Feb 24, 1941—Sep 29, 2016) was a Turkish engineer, Professor and Chairman of the Department of Industrial Engineering, Dean of the School of Engineering and Provost of Boğaziçi University.

Biography 
Ibrahim Kavrakoglu completed his doctorate at University of London after undergraduate studies Robert College in Istanbul. He returned to his alma mater as a professor. In the ensuing years, he served as Chairman of the Department of Industrial Engineering, Dean of the School of Engineering and Provost of Boğaziçi University.

Kavrakoglu twice accepted academic posts abroad. In 1973 and 1974 he was a visiting professor at Stanford University where he both taught in the Department of Mechanical Engineering and conducted research in systems modeling. In 1981, he returned to the United States as a visiting professor at the University of California, Berkeley. With a dual appointment, he taught in the Department of Industrial Engineering and Operational Research and the department of Mechanical Engineering. He also had the opportunity to expand his research in economic policy with use of the supercomputer at Berkeley Laboratories.

He has been the initiator and director of numerous major projects including development of Turkey's first National Energy Plan, the Mass Housing Project (which led to a value-added of $45 billion while creating 1.8 million units of housing and doubling Turkey's GNP growth rate over eight years) and the Turkish Quality Movement. The Mass Housing Project won a Franz Edelman Prize by the U.S. Institute of Management Sciences in 1988. In 1990, Kavrakoglu founded the Turkish Society for Quality and has been involved in the TQM transformation of more than 50 corporations.

In recent years, he has initiated a strategy for ICT-based national development which has been officially embraced by the Turkish Government. The sister company, Kavrakoğlu Consulting has conducted more than 200 consulting projects over the past two decades, Dr. Kavrakoğlu is a pilot and a competitive yachtsman.

Work 
Dr. Kavrakoglu's research has covered mechanical engineering (thermodynamics, acoustics and fluid mechanics); operations research (mathematical modeling, decision support systems); economics (macroeconomic simulation, econometrics) and business (strategy and finance.)

Publications 
He is the author of 24 books and more than 130 papers, including lead articles and invited papers in the European Journal of Operational Research, Mathematical Modeling, Omega, Automatica, Interfaces and Operations Research. The most recent, "Knowledge Leveraging - Post Modern O.R.," appeared in the April 2004 issue of OR/MS Today.

References

Turkish non-fiction writers
Turkish operations researchers
Turkish engineering academics
Turkish industrial engineers
Turkish economists
Living people
Turkish mechanical engineers
1941 births